Robert Harold Sainsbury (5 January 1916 – 11 May 2007) was an Australian rules footballer who played with Footscray in the Victorian Football League (VFL).

Sainsbury later served in the Royal Australian Air Force during World War II.

Notes

External links 

1916 births
2007 deaths
Australian rules footballers from Victoria (Australia)
Western Bulldogs players